Liston Harry Fonataba (born 12 March 1984) is an Indonesian professional footballer who currently plays as a defender for Perseru Serui in the Indonesia Super League.

External links
 
 Player profil at goal.com

1984 births
Living people
Indonesian footballers
Liga 1 (Indonesia) players
Perseru Serui players
Association football defenders